Mount Yoko may refer to:
 Mount Yoko (Hidaka), in Shinhidaka, Hokkaidō
 Mount Yoko (Northern Yatsugatake), in the Northern Yatsugatake Volcanic Group of the Yatsugatake Mountains on Honshū
 Mount Yoko (Southern Yatsugatake), in the Southern Yatsugatake Volcanic Group of the Yatsugatake Mountains on Honshū